This is a list of Chinese animated films, sorted by year. Also listed are the 20 highest-grossing Chinese animated feature films at the Chinese box office.

films by decade

1920s

1930s

1940s

1950s

1960s

1970s

1980s

1990s

2000s

2010s

2020s

Highest-grossing films
The following are the 20 highest-grossing Chinese animated feature films in China. Gross in million yuan.

See also
List of Chinese animated series
History of Chinese animation
Manhua

References

 
 
Chinese animated films
Animated